The canton of Épernay-2 is an administrative division of the Marne department, northeastern France. Its borders were modified at the French canton reorganisation which came into effect in March 2015. Its seat is in Épernay.

It consists of the following communes:
 
Avize
Brugny-Vaudancourt
Chavot-Courcourt
Chouilly
Cramant
Cuis
Épernay (partly)
Flavigny
Grauves
Les Istres-et-Bury
Mancy
Monthelon
Morangis
Moussy
Oiry
Pierry
Plivot
Vinay

References

Cantons of Marne (department)